Richwood is a small suburb situated on the northern outskirts of Cape Town, South Africa and is about  north-east of the city alongside the N7 freeway. According to the 2011 census it has a population of 2,988 residents in 963 households. The name is a portmanteau of "Richmond Park" and "Goodwood".

Transport 
Richwood is located between the N7 highway and the M13 (Tygerberg Valley Road). The M13 connects Richwood to Durbanville and Bothasig and also provides access to the N7 highway (to Cape Town and Malmesbury) via the M14 and M12.

References

Suburbs of Cape Town